Aliona Viktarauna Dubitskaya (born 25 January 1990) is a Belarusian athlete whose specialty is the shot put. She competed in the shot put event at the 2015 World Championships in Athletics in Beijing, China. In 2014, she tested positive for an illegal stimulant, Oxilofrine, and was banned for six months.

References

External links
 

1990 births
Living people
Belarusian female shot putters
World Athletics Championships athletes for Belarus
Doping cases in athletics
Belarusian sportspeople in doping cases
Athletes (track and field) at the 2016 Summer Olympics
Athletes (track and field) at the 2020 Summer Olympics
Olympic athletes of Belarus
People from Voranava District
Sportspeople from Grodno Region